Lucy Barfield (2 November 1935 – 3 May 2003) was the godchild of C.S. Lewis. The Lion, the Witch and the Wardrobe is dedicated to Lucy, who also lent her name to the book's heroine, Lucy Pevensie.

Lewis's Letter
Lewis's letter and the dedication to The Lion, the Witch and the Wardrobe reads:

My Dear Lucy,

I wrote this story for you, but when I began it I had not realized that girls grow quicker than books. As a result, you are already too old for fairy tales, and by the time it is printed and bound you will be older still. But some day you will be old enough to start reading fairy tales again. You can then take it down from some upper shelf, dust it, and tell me what you think of it. I shall probably be too deaf to hear, and too old to understand a word you say but I shall still be,

your affectionate Godfather,

C. S. Lewis.

Life
In 1923 Owen Barfield, who had been friends with Lewis since 1919, married musician and choreographer Maud Douie (1888–1980). They had three children: Alexander, born in 1928, his younger sister Lucy, born on 2 November 1935 and Geoffrey, born in 1940, who was a foster child. In May 1949, Lewis sent Lucy the completed manuscript of The Lion, the Witch and the Wardrobe with a letter in which he wrote that the book was originally written for her. On 16 October 1950, when the book was officially published in London, this letter was printed as its dedication. In September 1952, Lewis dedicated his The Voyage of the Dawn Treader to Lucy's brother Geoffrey.

Lucy was born in Carlisle, Cumberland. She was a very lively, friendly and happy child. From an early age she trained hard to be a ballet dancer. She also showed marked musical taste and ability. In about 1958 she became a qualified dance and music teacher and in 1960 her sinfonietta in three movements was publicly performed at Malvern College. She taught piano and dance at a Kentish school for girls, then at a specially built chalet in the garden of her family home, Westfield, in Hartley, Kent. She was an active member of the local community, giving talks in the church hall as well.

She was also interested in her father's work and accompanied him in 1965–66 during his second visiting professorship in America at Brandeis University. Lucy Barfield, then 30 years old, was a piano teacher of twelve students at the local music school in Cambridge, Massachusetts. In June. at the end of the school year Lucy's mother, Maud, joined them and, as part of their holiday, the three went together to visit Owen Barfield's friend Professor Craig Miller in Vancouver. Upon their return to England, Lucy was diagnosed with multiple sclerosis.

She had already been feeling some MS symptoms since 1963, the year C.S. Lewis died. Then she was determined to fight her disease by continuing dancing and teaching. But now, after a while, she could not leave her home and finally not even her bed. In 1968 Lucy had to be hospitalized and in 1977 she had to be hospitalized for the second time. Surprisingly she was able to leave the hospital in June 1978, when she married her friend Bevan Rake (1921–1990). But in 1990, after Bevan died, Lucy had to return to the hospital. She was never to leave it again.

Failing health

Her body continued to decline. For the last five years of her life she was unable to move, speak or feed herself. However she continued to fight her disease becoming an inspiration to everyone who knew her. Walter Hooper writes in his obituary and also Paul Ford notes it in his Companion to Narnia: "As every creature comfort was taken from her, Lucy's faith in God grew and blessed not only her, but also those who knew her. Owen Barfield, touched by her humility, said many times,  'I could go down on my knees before my daughter.'''"

Death

Her mother died in 1980, and her father in 1997. Her brother Alexander visited her often. She liked to listen to  Geoffrey reading her The Chronicles of Narnia over and over again. Lucy Barfield died at the Royal Hospital for Neuro-disability in west London on 3 May 2003, having battled multiple sclerosis for almost 40 years.

Bibliography

 C. S. Lewis. The Lion, the Witch and the Wardrobe. A Story for Children. Illustrations by Pauline Baynes. Published by Geoffrey Bles. London, 1950 [October 16].
 Walter Hooper. Lucy Barfield (1935–2003). An Obituary. In SEVEN: An Anglo-American Literary Review, Volume 20, 2003, p. 5.
 Owen A. and Adelene Barfield. In search of Lucy: The Life of Lucy Barfield. In SEVEN: An Anglo-American Literary Review, Volume 27, 2010, pp. 29 - 32.   Owen A. Barfield is the son of Lucy's brother Alexander.
 Paul F Ford. Companion to Narnia: Dedications. Fifth Edition, 2005, pp 160–61.
 Nicholas Roe. The Lion, The Witch and the real Lucy. The Times (UK), 11 January 1999: pp. 4–5.  An excerpt  here.
 Simon Blaxland-de Lange. Owen Barfield: Romanticism Come of Age. A Biography. 2006, pp 69, 142, 309, 337.
  Into the Wardrobe Forum. Lucy Barfield: The Real Lucy of Narnia. 40 posts, 13247 views. 2006-2010. Retrieved 2010-08-27.
 Lucy Barfield. In Owen Barfield Literary Estate 1997-2017. Retrieved 2017-06-21.   A short article, chronology and seven pictures of Lucy.

References

External links

People from Carlisle, Cumbria
1935 births
2003 deaths
People with multiple sclerosis